Erdahl is a surname. Notable people with the surname include:

Arlen Erdahl (born 1931), American politician
Dale Erdahl (1931–2005), American businessman, farmer, and politician
Jamie Erdahl (born 1988), American television reporter
Ludwig B. Erdahl (1889-1969), American farmer and politician
Paul Erdahl (1902–1985), Norwegian boxer
Thor Erdahl (born 1951), Norwegian painter